Albele may refer to:

 A village in Bârsănești, a commune in Romania 
 Albele River (disambiguation), the name of several rivers in Romania